Pedro Figueiredo (born 13 June 1991) is a Portuguese professional golfer. In June 2018 won the KPMG Trophy on the Challenge Tour.

Amateur career
Figueiredo had a successful amateur career. At the age of 12, he represented his country at the 2003 European Boys' Team Championship for the first of seven appearances. He won the Boys Amateur Championship and Irish Amateur Open Championship in 2008.

Figueiredo played college golf at the UCLA where he won three events. He turned professional in mid-2013 after competing in the 2013 Palmer Cup.

Professional career
Figueiredo played on the Challenge Tour from 2013 to 2016 with little success. In 2017 he played on the Pro Golf Tour. Although he did not win any tournaments, he had a consistent season with three runners-up finishes and 10 other top-10 finishes to end the season fourth in the Order of Merit and earn a place on the 2018 Challenge Tour.

In June 2018, Figueiredo won the KPMG Trophy in Belgium, beating Anton Karlsson and Stuart Manley in a playoff, with a birdie at the first extra hole. Two weeks later he finished in third place in the SSE Scottish Hydro Challenge. He ended the season in 15th place in the Order of Merit, the last place to earn a card on the 2019 European Tour. He holed a 12-foot birdie at the final hole of the Challenge Tour Grand Final to finish 600 euros ahead of Tom Murray.

Amateur wins
This list in incomplete
2008 Boys Amateur Championship, Irish Amateur Open Championship
2011 Firestone Grill Cal Poly Invitational
2013 Prestige at PGA West, Western Intercollegiate
Source:

Professional wins (1)

Challenge Tour wins (1)

Challenge Tour playoff record (1–0)

Team appearances
Amateur
European Boys' Team Championship (representing Portugal): 2003, 2004, 2005, 2006 2007, 2008, 2009
European Amateur Team Championship (representing Portugal): 2005, 2007, 2008, 2009, 2010, 2011, 2013
Jacques Léglise Trophy (representing the Continent of Europe): 2006 (winners), 2007, 2009
Eisenhower Trophy (representing Portugal): 2006, 2008, 2010, 2012
Junior Ryder Cup (representing Europe): 2006 (tie)
Palmer Cup (representing Europe): 2013

See also
2018 Challenge Tour graduates
2019 European Tour Qualifying School graduates
2022 European Tour Qualifying School graduates

References

External links

Portuguese male golfers
European Tour golfers
UCLA Bruins men's golfers
1991 births
Living people